The men's 1500 metres speed skating competition of the 2010 Winter Olympics in Vancouver was held at the Richmond Olympic Oval on 20 February 2010.

Records
Prior to this competition, the existing world and Olympic records were as follows.

No new world or Olympic records were set during this competition.

Results

References

External links
 

Men's speed skating at the 2010 Winter Olympics